Monochamus titillator (southern pine sawyer) is a species of beetle in the family Cerambycidae. It was described by Johan Christian Fabricius in 1775. It is known from the United States.

References

titillator
Beetles described in 1775
Taxa named by Johan Christian Fabricius